La Mina Airport, or Jorge Isaacs Airport,  is an airport serving Maicao, a municipality in the La Guajira Department in Colombia.

The Cerrejon VOR-DME (Ident: CJN) is located on the field.

As of May 2018 the airport is not serviced by any airline. SATENA, a regional airline based in the capital city of Bogota suspended all flights to Jorge Isaacs Airport.

See also

Transport in Colombia
List of airports in Colombia

References

External links 
OpenStreetMap - La Mina
OurAirports - La Mina
SkyVector - La Mina
FallingRain - La Mina Airport

Airports in Colombia
Buildings and structures in La Guajira Department